Malkmus is a surname. Notable people with the surname include:

 Bobby Malkmus (born 1931), American baseball player and scout
 Stephen Malkmus (born 1966), American singer-songwriter and guitarist

See also
 Malkus